The women's rhythmic team competition at the 2018 Asian Games took place on 27 August 2018 at the Jakarta International Expo Hall D2.

Schedule
All times are Western Indonesia Time (UTC+07:00)

Results

References

External links
Results

Rhythmic Women's team all-around